This is a record of Colombia's results at the FIFA World Cup. The FIFA World Cup is an international association football competition contested by the men's national teams of the members of Fédération Internationale de Football Association (FIFA), the sport's global governing body. The championship has been awarded every four years since the first tournament in 1930, except in 1942 and 1946, due to World War II.

The tournament consists of two parts, the qualification phase and the final phase (officially called the World Cup Finals). The qualification phase, which currently takes place over the three years preceding the Finals, is used to determine which teams qualify for the Finals. The current format of the Finals involves 32 teams competing for the title, at venues within the host nation (or nations) over a period of about a month. The World Cup Finals is the most widely viewed sporting event in the world, with an estimated 715.1 million people watching the 2006 tournament final.

Colombia has appeared in the FIFA World Cup on six occasions in 1962, 1990, 1994, 1998, 2014 and 2018.

Overall record

*Draws include knockout matches decided via penalty shoot-out

By match

By opponent

Colombia at the 1962 FIFA World Cup
In the 1962 qualifiers, they faced Peru in a two-game series and qualified for their first World Cup.

Colombia qualified.

At Chile 1962, Colombia lost 2–1 to South American champions Uruguay in their opening match. They then drew 4–4 with the reigning European champions Soviet Union in one of biggest shocks at Chile 1962. In this game, Colombia scored four goals against Soviet goalkeeper Lev Yashin, widely considered the best goalkeeper in football history. Also in that game, Marcos Coll scored the only Olympic goal in World Cup history. Additionally, in coming back from three goals down to draw the match, the Colombians completed the biggest comeback to draw in World Cup history. Unfortunately, their campaign ended with a 5–0 defeat to Euro 1960 runners-up Yugoslavia, so they went out in the group stage.

Group One

Colombia at the 1990 FIFA World Cup
At Italia '90, Colombia defeated United Arab Emirates 2–0, lost to Yugoslavia 1–0, and earned their place in the Round of Sixteen after a dramatic 1–1 draw with West Germany, which would later win the Cup.
Group D

During their Round of Sixteen match against Cameroon, the game went into extra time after a 0–0 draw. In an unfortunate moment, goalkeeper René Higuita failed to protect the ball  from the goal line, enabling Cameroon striker Roger Milla to snatch it from him, and score Cameroon's decisive second goal. Milla struck twice, giving Cameroon a 2–0 lead in extra time. Colombia would score in the 115th minute, but were unable to get an equalizer.

Colombia at the 1994 FIFA World Cup

Qualification — CONMEBOL Group One

Colombia qualified. Argentina advanced to the CONMEBOL / CONCACAF / OFC Intercontinental Play-off.

Colombia finished top of their qualifying group without having lost a match, which included a historic 5–0 win over Argentina in Buenos Aires. Expectations of the team were high, some even naming them as favourites to win the tournament.

The match between Colombia and Romania was the first game for either side in the group phase. Romania took the lead in the 16th minute with their first attack of the match when Raducioiu took on three defenders before firing home a low shot. On the half hour mark, Hagi made it 2–0 when he noticed Córdoba out of position and dipped a cross over his head into the net. Valencia pulled a goal back for the Colombians in the 43rd minute when he headed in a corner from Perez. In the second half, Raducioiu put the result beyond doubt with his second goal in the final few minutes.

The team went into their second group game against the United States knowing they had to win to have any chance of progressing. On the 35th minute Andrés Escobar attempted to cut out a cross but accidentally deflected the ball into his own net. Earnie Stewart took the US two goals in front after scoring in the 56th minute. Valencia scored a consolation goal for Colombia in the closing minutes of the match.
They did win their final group match 2–0 over Switzerland, but it was not enough to help them progress

Group A

Andrés Escobar

Six days after Colombia's last match against Switzerland, Andrés Escobar was shot in Medellín by known drug cartel criminals. Escobar had previously scored an own goal in the Group Stage match against the United States.

Colombia at the 1998 FIFA World Cup
Colombia began their qualification rounds in South America well and ended in third place with 28 points, 2 points below Argentina who was in 1st place with 30 points. They ended in Group G with Tunisia, England, and Romania.

Qualification For France 98: A total of 10 CONMEBOL teams entered the competition. The South American zone was allocated 5 places (out of 32) in the final tournament. Brazil, the defending champions, qualified automatically, leaving 4 spots open for competition between 9 teams.

Argentina, Paraguay, Colombia and Chile qualified.

Group G

In their opening match, Adrian Ilie of Valencia CF gave Romania a 1–0 victory over Colombia after he placed a magnificent chip shot in the 44th minute from some  that sailed over goalkeeper Faryd Mondragón into the net.

Colombia's second match was against Tunisia. Colombia's Léider Preciado struck seven minutes from the end to give a 1–0 win.

Although England needed only a draw to guarantee a place in the Final 16, Darren Anderton drove home a fiercely struck angled drive in the 20th minute. David Beckham curled in a  free kick nine minutes later and England won the game 2–0. Colombia was thus eliminated.

Colombia at the 2014 FIFA World Cup
After 16 years out of the World Cup, Colombia won their first match against Greece by a score of 3–0, marking the country's best ever performance in FIFA World Cup. The first goal was scored by Pablo Armero five minutes after the kick-off, Teofilo Gutierrez scored the second goal from a corner shot, James Rodriguez made their final score during the three minutes overtime. Colombia went on to beat Ivory Coast 2-1 and Japan 4–1. For the first time in history, Colombia won their group in group stages at the Fifa World Cup. They defeated Uruguay 2–0 in the Round of 16, marking the deepest run in the World Cup ever for the Colombia national team. They met Brazil in the quarter-finals and were narrowly defeated 2–1, bringing to an end their most successful World Cup campaign to date.
Final Standings

Brazil (host), Argentina, Colombia, Chile, Ecuador and Uruguay qualified.
Group C

The two teams had met in one previous match, in a friendly in 1994, where Colombia won 2–0. Colombia midfielder Fredy Guarín was suspended for the match, after being sent off in the team's final qualifier against Paraguay.

Colombia took the lead within five minutes, Juan Cuadrado's cutback was converted by Pablo Armero via a deflection off Greek defender Kostas Manolas. Colombia extended the lead in the second half, when Abel Aguilar flicked on a corner kick from James Rodríguez and Teófilo Gutiérrez scored from close range.
Greece's best chance fell to Theofanis Gekas, who headed against the bar. In stoppage time, Cuadrado set up James to complete the scoring with a low shot.

The 3–0 scoreline was Colombia's biggest win to date in the World Cup.

The two teams had never met before.

After a goalless first half, Colombia scored first when James Rodríguez headed in Juan Cuadrado's corner.
The lead was extended six minutes later when Ivory Coast was caught in possession, and Teófilo Gutiérrez released substitute Juan Quintero to score. Ivory Coast reduced the deficit through Gervinho, who received a pass from Arthur Boka in the left wing, dribbled past three Colombian players and shot home.

The second goal of the tournament by James allowed him to join Bernardo Redín and Adolfo Valencia as the only Colombian players to score more than one goal in the World Cup.

The two teams had met in two previous matches, most recently in a friendly in 2007, and also in the 2003 FIFA Confederations Cup group stage, won by Colombia 1–0.

Colombia took the lead mid-way through the first half, with Juan Cuadrado taking a penalty kick, shooting low down the middle after Japan centre back Yasuyuki Konno fouled Colombia striker Adrián Ramos in the box.
Japan then equalised through Shinji Okazaki's headed goal from a cross from Keisuke Honda on the right in first half stoppage time. Colombia's James Rodríguez was introduced after the half time break, and was credited for providing two assists for two goals scored by Jackson Martínez, on 55 minutes when he shot low to the net with his left foot, and 82 minutes when he curled the ball in from the right of the penalty area with his left foot, before finishing off the scoring with a strike of his own, assisted by Ramos, where he beat the last man before clipping the ball over the goalkeeper. Colombia, which had already qualified for the knockout stage but needed a point to be certain of winning the group, finished as group winners with a perfect record of three wins out of three, while Japan, which had to win the match to have any chance to qualify, were eliminated.

He also set the record for the longest time between World Cup appearances as 15 years and 363 days had passed since his last versus England at the 1998 World Cup, breaking Alfred Bickel's record of 12 years and 13 days between appearances (1938–1950).

Eighth-finals
The two teams had met in 38 previous matches, including in the 1962 FIFA World Cup group stage, won 2–1 by Uruguay. Their most recent meetings were in the 2014 FIFA World Cup qualifiers, with both teams winning at home, Colombia winning 4–0 and Uruguay winning 2–0. Uruguayan striker Luis Suárez was not in the line-up because of a nine-game ban imposed by FIFA due to a biting incident involving Italian defender Giorgio Chiellini during their final group stage match.

Colombia won 2–0 with both goals from James Rodríguez, the first in the 28th minute, where he controlled Abel Aguilar's headed ball on his chest before volleying left-footed from 25 yards out with the ball going in off the underside of the crossbar, which won the 2014 FIFA Puskás Award later in the year.
The second goal, in the 50th minute, was a close-range shot from six yards out after receiving the ball from a header by Juan Cuadrado on the right.

Colombia progressed through to the quarter-finals for the first time in their history, where they would face Brazil.

Quarter-finals
The two teams had met in 25 previous matches, but never in the FIFA World Cup. This was the first time Colombia had reached the quarter-finals of the World Cup. Brazil midfielder Luiz Gustavo was suspended for the match due to accumulation of yellow cards.

Brazil took the lead in the 7th minute, when Neymar's corner from the left was turned in from close range by Thiago Silva.
They doubled the lead in the 69th minute when David Luiz scored directly from a long-range free kick, side-footing the ball over the wall and into the top-right corner. Colombia reduced the deficit with 10 minutes to go, when James Rodríguez converted a penalty kick low into the left corner and sent the goalkeeper the wrong way. The penalty was awarded after substitute Carlos Bacca was fouled by Brazil goalkeeper Júlio César. Neymar was kneed in the back by Colombia defender Juan Camilo Zúñiga in the 88th minute, which resulted in the striker's withdrawal from the match. Subsequent medical evaluation discovered a fractured vertebra, forcing the Brazilian to miss the remainder of the tournament. Brazil advanced to the semi-final, where they faced Germany.

James's sixth goal of the tournament was enough for him to win the Golden Boot award. He also became the first player to score in his first five career World Cup matches since Peru's Teófilo Cubillas (across the 1970 and 1978 tournaments).

Colombia at the 2018 FIFA World Cup
Final standings

Group stage

The two teams had met in three previous matches, most recently in a 2014 FIFA World Cup group stage game, won by Colombia 4–1.

In the third minute, Carlos Sánchez blocked Shinji Kagawa's 20-yard shot with his arm and the referee pointed to the penalty spot before showing the midfielder a straight red card. After lengthy protests, Sanchez eventually left the field and Kagawa slotted the penalty into the bottom right corner of the net. José Pékerman then replaced Juan Cuadrado with Wílmar Barrios at the half-hour mark, and an equaliser arrived nine minutes later, from a Juan Fernando Quintero free kick, shot low under the jumping wall which the goalkeeper failed to keep out. In the second half, David Ospina dived full length to his left to stop Takashi Inui's curling 20-yard shot. Yuya Osako then headed the ball into the far corner of the net from a Keisuke Honda corner from the left. With 13 minutes left, James Rodríguez's strike from inside the box was turned over the crossbar by the outstretched leg of Osako.

The two teams had met in five matches, most recently in a 2006 friendly, won by Colombia 2–1.

Abel Aguilar was taken from the field on a stretcher in the 32nd minute and was replaced by Mateus Uribe. Shortly after, a cross by James Rodríguez from the right was met by the head of Yerry Mina, who lost his marker to head over Wojciech Szczęsny's outstretched arms and into the net. Juan Fernando Quintero fired wide from 25 yards at the start of the second half. Cuadrado then squared to Radamel Falcao on the edge of the box who lifted his shot well over the crossbar. In the 58th minute, Robert Lewandowski controlled a long pass only to shoot straight into David Ospina's midriff as Poland attempted their first shot on target of the game. Quintero's slide-rule pass presented Falcao with a one-on-one situation and he guided the ball past Szczęsny with the outside of his right foot to double his side's lead. With 15 minutes left on the clock, James' pass from the left found Cuadrado in space through the middle and he took a touch before finishing it into the bottom-right corner of the net.

Poland were the first European nation to be eliminated from the 2018 World Cup. Including Colombia's victory against Poland, there were 14 World Cup goals scored on 24 June 2018 - the most on a single day of action in the competition (maximum 3 games) since 10 June 1990 (also 14).

The two teams had met only once, a 2014 friendly game which ended in a 2–2 draw.

The referee awarded Senegal a penalty in the 17th minute. After consulting VAR, he judged that defender Davinson Sánchez had won the ball before making any contact with Sadio Mané. After half an hour, James Rodríguez was substituted with what appeared to be a recurrence of the injury that kept him out of Colombia's 2–1 loss to Japan. Mané took a free-kick in the 64th minute which he shot off-target. Kalidou Koulibaly got a touch on a Luis Muriel drive to deflect the ball narrowly wide. And in the 74th minute Colombia scored the decisive goal of the game, Juan Quintero's corner from the right found Yerry Mina who rose and crashed home a header that went through goalkeeper Khadim N'Diaye.

With Senegal being the last African team to be knocked out of Russia 2018, there were no teams from Africa in the Round of 16 for the first time since the stage was introduced in 1986. Colombia were the only team to reach the knockout stages of Russia 2018 despite losing their opening match of the tournament. Senegal became the third team to be eliminated from Russia 2018 despite winning their opening game of the tournament (also Iran and Serbia); and even moreover, this was the first time Senegal got eliminated from the group stage, despite owning a huge advantage prior to the match against Colombia. The last time as many as three teams failed to get through the group stages despite winning their opener was in 2002 (Argentina, Costa Rica and Russia).

Eighth-finals
The teams had faced each other in five previous matches, including one World Cup group stage match in 1998, a 2–0 England win. Their most recent meeting came in a friendly in 2005, a 3–2 England win.

In the 16th minute, Harry Kane arrived beyond the back post to meet a Kieran Trippier cross, but was unable to direct his header on target. Wílmar Barrios was booked when he appeared to headbutt Jordan Henderson in the build-up to a free-kick Trippier bent narrowly wide. Colombia gave away a penalty early in the second half when Carlos Sánchez dragged Kane down in the box after a corner from the right. Kane scored from 12 yards, shooting down the middle to give England the lead. Colombia forced their way into extra-time, Yerry Mina scoring a downward header from a Juan Cuadrado corner from the right. Eric Dier scored the final penalty in the shoot-out, England came from 3–2 down after Mateus Uribe and Carlos Bacca failed to convert their spot-kicks.

This was the first time that England had won a penalty shoot-out at the FIFA World Cup, and only the second time they had won on penalties at any major tournament (the previous occasion being against Spain at Euro 1996). Kane became the first player to score in six consecutive England appearances since Tommy Lawton did so in 1939. England conceded in injury time at the end of the second half for the first time in World Cup history, with Mina's goal coming after 92 minutes and 33 seconds.

Squads

1962 World Cup

Head coach:  Adolfo Pedernera

1990 World Cup

Head coach:  Francisco Maturana

1994 World Cup

Head coach:  Francisco Maturana

1998 World Cup

Head coach:  Hernán Darío Gómez

2014 World Cup

Head coach:  José Pékerman

2018 FIFA World Cup

Head coach:  José Pékerman

Record players

Current as of 03 July 2018 after the match v England

Goalscorers

Colombia's record World Cup scorer, James Rodríguez, has also won the Golden Boot when he scored 6 goals in the 2014 FIFA World Cup.

 Own goals scored for opponents
 Andrés Escobar (scored for the United States in 1994)

Current as of 3 July 2018 after the match v England

Awards and records

Team Awards
FIFA Fair Play Trophy 2014

Individual Awards
Golden Boot 2014: James Rodríguez

Records
Only tournament goal directly from a corner: Marcos Coll (1962 v USSR)

References

External links
Colombia World Cup Record

 
Countries at the FIFA World Cup